A controlled explosion is a method for detonating or disabling a suspected explosive device.

Methods which are used to set off a controlled explosion include clearing the area and using a bomb disposal robot to attach a shaped charge to the suspected bomb to sever the explosive from its detonator.

Another classic method of controlled explosion is to place the suspected bomb in a skip and fill it with sand before detonating it with a self-incendiary device or a fuse.

See also 
 Bomb disposal
 DEMIRA

External links
 BBC News summary of "controlled explosions"

Law enforcement techniques
Bomb disposal